Salton Sea Airport  is a privately owned, public use airport located one nautical mile (2 km) southwest of the central business district of Salton City, across California State Highway 86 from the western border of the new community of Sea View Beach (formerly the Salton Sea Test Base B-1) and the Sea View Beach Dunes in Imperial County, California, United States.

Facilities and aircraft 
Salton Sea Airport covers an area of 208 acres (84 ha) at an elevation of 84 feet (26 m) below mean sea level. It has one runway designated 7/25 with a gravel surface measuring 5,000 by 75 feet (1,524 x 23 m). For the 12-month period ending December 31, 2009, the airport had 350 general aviation aircraft operations, an average of 29 per month.

References

External links 
 Aerial image as of June 2002 from USGS The National Map

Airports in Imperial County, California